Television in Japan was introduced in 1939. However, experiments date back to the 1920s, with Kenjiro Takayanagi's pioneering experiments in electronic television. Television broadcasting was halted by World War II, after which regular television broadcasting began in 1950. After Japan developed the first HDTV systems in the 1960s, MUSE/Hi-Vision was introduced in the 1970s. 

A modified version of the NTSC system for analog signals, called NTSC-J, was used for analog broadcast between 1950 and the early 2010s. The analog broadcast in Japan was replaced with a digital broadcasts using the ISDB standard. ISDB supersedes both the NTSC-J analog television system and the previously used MUSE Hi-vision analog HDTV system in Japan. Digital Terrestrial Television Broadcasting (DTTB) services using ISDB-T (ISDB-T International) started in Japan in December 2003, and since then, Japan adopted ISDB over other digital broadcasting standards.

All Japanese households having at least one television set are mandated to hold a television license, with funds primarily used to subsidize NHK, the Japanese public service broadcaster. The fee varies from ¥13,650 to ¥24,740 (¥12,255 to ¥23,585 for households residing in Okinawa Prefecture) depending on the method and timing of payment, and on whether one receives only terrestrial television or also satellite broadcasts. Households on welfare may be excused from the license fee. In any case, there is no authority to impose sanctions or fines in the event of non-payment; people may (and many do) throw away the bills and turn away the occasional bill collector, without consequence.

History 

In 1924, Kenjiro Takayanagi began a research program on electronic television. In 1925, he demonstrated a cathode ray tube (CRT) television with thermal electron emission. Television tests were conducted in 1926 using a combined mechanical Nipkow disk and electronic Braun tube system. In 1926, he demonstrated a CRT television with 40-line resolution, the first working example of a fully electronic television receiver. In 1927, he increased the television resolution to 100 lines, which was unrivaled until 1931. In 1928, he was the first to transmit human faces in half-tones on television.

An all-electronic system was adopted in the 1930s using a domestically developed iconoscope system. In spite of that, because of the beginning of World War II in the Pacific region, this first full-fledged TV broadcast experimentation lasted only a few months. Regular television broadcasts in Japan only started in 1950, several years after the war. In 1953, the public NHK General TV and the commercial Nippon Television were launched in the span of a few months. At the time, there were only 3,000 television sets. The year following the royal wedding of Crown Prince Akihito in 1959, the number of sets had increased to 12 million.

The Nippon Hōsō Kyōkai (NHK, the Japan Broadcasting Corporation) began conducting research to "unlock the fundamental mechanism of video and sound interactions with the five human senses" in 1964, after the Tokyo Olympics. NHK set out to create an HDTV system that ended up scoring much higher in subjective tests than NTSC's previously dubbed "HDTV". This new system, NHK Color, created in 1972, included 1,125 lines, a 5:3 aspect ratio and 60 Hz refresh rate. The Society of Motion Picture and Television Engineers (SMPTE), headed by Charles Ginsburg, became the testing and study authority for HDTV technology in the international theater. SMPTE would test HDTV systems from different companies from every conceivable perspective, but the problem of combining the different formats plagued the technology for many years.

Terrestrial television
In Japan, there are seven national television networks – two owned by the national public broadcaster NHK, and five national commercial key stations. Although some of the network names shown below are used only for news programming, the applicable organizations also distribute a variety of other programs over most of the same stations.
Tokyo NHK General TV (東京NHK総合テレビジョン) (AK)
Tokyo NHK Educational TV (東京NHK教育テレビジョン) (AB)
Tokyo TV Asahi (東京テレビ朝日) (EX)
Tokyo Fuji TV (東京フジテレビ) (CX)
Tokyo Nippon TV (東京日本テレビ) (AX)
Tokyo TBS Television (東京TBSテレビ) (RX)
TV Tokyo (テレビ東京) (TX)

Tokyo Skytree

Digital television 

Japan pioneered HDTV for decades with an analog implementation (MUSE/Hi-Vision) in the late 1980s.  The old system is not compatible with the new digital standards.  Japanese terrestrial broadcasting of HD via ISDB-T started on December 1, 2003 in the Tokyo, Osaka, and Nagoya metropolitan areas. It has been reported that 27 million HD receivers had been sold in Japan as of October 2007.

The Japanese government is studying the implementation of some improvements on the standard as suggested by Brazilian researchers (SBTVD). These new features are unlikely to be adopted in Japan due to incompatibility problems but are being considered for use in future implementations in other countries, including Brazil itself.

Analog terrestrial television broadcasts in Japan were scheduled to end on July 24, 2011, as per the current Japanese broadcasting law. However, the switch-over was delayed in Fukushima, Miyagi, and Iwate prefectures, due to a desire to reduce the inconvenience of those affected most by the 2011 Tōhoku earthquake and tsunami and subsequent Fukushima Daiichi nuclear disaster. In those areas, analog broadcasting ended on March 31, 2012.

Cable television
Cable television was introduced to Japan in 1955, in Shibukawa, Gunma Prefecture. Until the 1980s, cable television in Japan was mainly limited to rural mountainous areas and outlying islands where the reception of terrestrial television was poor. Cable television started to proliferate in urban areas in the late 1980s, beginning with Tokyo, whose first cable television station began broadcasting in 1987. In the mid 1990s, two-way multichannel cable television platforms first appeared in the market; broadband internet services started being bundled to cable television subscriptions in the late 1990s.

Currently, there are several national and regional cable television providers in Japan, the largest being J:COM (a KDDI and Sumitomo Corporation joint-venture) and its subsidiary Japan Cablenet (JCN). These companies currently compete with the Japanese satellite television platforms SKY PerfecTV! and WOWOW, as well as the IPTV platform Hikari TV operated by NTT Plala.

Japan Cable Television Engineering Association (JCTEA) is the umbrella organisation representing 600 member companies involved in research, designing, manufacturing, installation and maintenance of cable television facilities in Japan.

Satellite IPTV television 
The medium-scale Broadcasting Satellite for Experimental Purposes (BSE) was planned by Ministry of Posts and Telecommunications (MOPT) and developed by the National Space Development Agency of Japan (NASDA) since 1974. After that, the first Japanese experimental broadcasting satellite, called BSE or Yuri, was launched in 1978. NHK started experimental broadcasting of TV program using BS-2a satellite in May 1984.

The satellite BS-2a was launched in preparation for the start of full scale 2-channel broadcasts. Broadcasting Satellite BS-2a was the first national DBS (direct broadcasting satellite), transmitting signals directly into the home of TV viewers. Attitude control of the satellite was conducted using the 3-axial method (zero momentum), and design life was 5 years. The TV transponder units are designed to sufficiently amplify transmitted signals to enable reception by small, 40 or 60 cm home-use parabolic antennas. The satellite was equipped with 3 TV transponders (including reserve units). However, one transponder malfunctioned 2 months after launch (March 23, 1984) and a second transponder malfunctioned 3 months after launch (May 3, 1984). So, the scheduled satellite broadcasting had to be hastily adjusted to test broadcasting on a single channel.

Later, NHK started regular service (NTSC) and experimental HDTV broadcasting using BS-2b in June 1989. Some Japanese producers of home electronic consumer devices began to deliver TV sets, VCRs and even home acoustic systems equipped with built-in satellite tuners or receivers. Such electronic goods had a specific BS logo.

In April 1991, Japanese company JSB started a pay TV service while BS-3 communication satellite was in use. In 1996 total number of households that receive satellite broadcasting exceeded 10 million.

The modern two satellite systems in use in Japan are BSAT and JCSAT; the modern WOWOW Broadcasting Satellite digital service uses BSAT satellites, while other systems of digital TV broadcasting such as SKY PerfecTV! and Hikari TV uses JCSAT satellites.

Satellite IPTV channels

BS Channels (HD)

BS Channels (4K/8K)

CS Channels (SKY PerfecTV!/Hikari TV, HD)

CS Channels (SKY PerfecTV!/Hikari TV, 4K)

Programs 
While TV programs vary from station to station, some generalizations can be made. Most commercial television stations sign on between the hours of 4:00 AM and 5:00 AM every morning. Early morning hours are dominated by news programs, and these run from around 9:00 to 9:30 AM. They are then replaced by late morning shows that target wives who have finished their housework. These run to around 1:30 PM, at which time reruns of dramas and information programs that target the same age group start. On some stations at 4:00 PM, the young kid-oriented anime and TV shows start, and end around 7:00 PM or 8:00 PM. Evening news programs air as early as before 4:00 PM or before 5:00 PM and end at 7:00 PM, when the "Golden Hour" of TV shows start. 7:00 PM to 9:00 PM are the time periods into which TV stations pour the most resources. Appearing in this time slot is a certain sign that an actor or actress is a TV star. After 9:00 they switch over to Japanese television dramas and programs focusing on older age groups, which run till 10:00 or 11:00 PM. Stations run their late night news mostly at the 11:00 PM hour, and around midnight sports news programs run which target working ages. After these, programs for mature audiences run as well as anime that do not expect enough viewers if they were run earlier. Some commercial stations sign off between 2:00 AM and 3:00 AM every night; however, most stations affiliated with NNS or JNN broadcast 24 hours a day, with the sign off window replaced by a simulcast of their networks' news channel during the overnight hours. Other stations do filler programming to fill time before the start of early morning news. Commercial stations sometimes sign off on Sunday late nights or other days for technical maintenance. NHK is required to broadcast 24 hours a day, 7 days a week.

The Japanese have sometimes subdivided television series and dramas into , from the French term "cours" (both singular and plural) for "course", which is a 3-month period usually of 13 episodes. Each kūru generally has its own opening and ending image sequence and song, recordings of which are often sold. A six-month period of 26 episodes is also used for subdivision in some television series.

Drama 

 are a staple of Japanese television and are broadcast daily. All major TV networks in Japan produce a variety of drama series including romance, comedies, detective stories, horror, and many others. With a theme, there may be a one-episode drama, or 2-nights, that may be aired on special occasions, such as in 2007 where they had a drama produced as a sixty-year anniversary from the end of the World War II, with a theme of the atomic bomb.

Science fiction 

Japan has a long history of producing science fiction series for TV. Non-anime science fiction are still largely unknown to foreign audiences. An exception is Power Rangers and their subsequent series that used battle sequences from the Super Sentai counterpart and combined them with American actors who acted out entirely original story lines.

Anime 

, taken from half of the Japanese pronunciation of "animation", is the Japanese word for animation in general, but is used more specifically to mean "Japanese animation" in the rest of the world. Anime dates from about 1917. TV networks regularly broadcast anime programming. In Japan, major national TV networks, such as TV Tokyo broadcast anime regularly. Smaller regional stations broadcast anime on UHF. Fairy Tail, Naruto, Pokémon, Bleach, Dragon Ball, Case Closed and One Piece are examples of anime.  While many popular series air during the daytime and evening hours, most air only at night from 12:00am – 4:00am. These series usually make profits primarily through BD (Blu-ray Disc)/DVD sales and merchandising rather than through television advertising. Some anime series are original, but most are intended to promote something else, such as an ongoing manga, light novel, or video game series which they are usually based on.

Variety shows 

Japanese variety shows (also known as Japanese game shows) are television entertainment made up of a variety of original stunts, musical performances, comedy skits, quiz contests, and other acts. Japanese television programs such as Music Station and Utaban continue in an almost pristine format from the same variety shows of years before. The only major changes have been the increasing disappearance of live backup music since the 1980s.

Most viewed channels

See also
 List of Japanese-language television channels
 Hobankyo—Organization based in Japan that enforces broadcast television copyright issues.
 Video Research—company which conducts audience measurement for television and radio
NHK

References

Further reading